Now Then... is the fourth album by Stiff Little Fingers, released in 1982 (see 1982 in music).

Track listing
"Falling Down" (Fingers, Gordon Ogilvie) – 3:19
"Won't Be Told" (Fingers, Ogilvie) – 3:25
"Love of the Common People" (John Hurley, Ronnie Wilkins, arranged by Fingers) – 2:39
"The Price of Admission" (Fingers, Ogilvie) – 3:22
"Touch and Go" (Fingers, Ogilvie) – 3:22
"Stands to Reason" (Fingers, Ogilvie) – 3:06
"Bits of Kids" (Fingers, Ogilvie) – 3:40
"Welcome to the Whole Week" (Fingers, Ogilvie) – 3:45
"Big City Night" (Fingers, Ogilvie) – 3:55
"Talkback" (Fingers, Ogilvie) – 2:48
"Is That What You Fought the War For?" (Fingers, Ogilvie) – 3:55

The following tracks were included on the 2001 EMI re-release:

Chart position

Personnel
Stiff Little Fingers
Jake Burns – vocals, guitar, occasional keyboards
Dolphin Taylor – drums, percussion, vocals, occasional keyboards
Henry Cluney – guitar, vocals
Ali McMordie – bass guitar
with:
Dick Morrissey, Jeff Daly, Martin Drover - horns on "Talkback"
Technical
Tim Friese-Greene - producer on "Talkback"
Simon Hanhart - engineer
Brian Cooke - artwork, photography

References

1982 albums
Stiff Little Fingers albums
Chrysalis Records albums